Ta'Kaiya Skoden Stoodis Kayden Gwanden Blaney (born 2001) is a singer, award-winning actress, speaker, and environmental activist from the Tla A'min Nation in British Columbia, Canada. She is an ambassador for the Native Children’s Survival Indigenous Children Fund and Salish Sea Youth Foundation and is known for giving speeches at UN meetings around the world, including Rio+20 and TUNZA UN.

Awards and achievements 
For her work in the 2017 film Kayak to Klemtu, Blaney won a Leo Award for Best Lead Performance. In 2020, she was the recipient of an Indspire Award.  works and nominations include the film Monkey Beach and two Leo Award nominations for Best Performance. Blaney released her first music release and music video, “Shallow Waters,” at age 10, which “brought her national acclaim and earned her multiple awards and cultural honors” (Romero). For her latest music picture, “Earth Revolution,” she won the Best Music Video at the 2016 American Indian Film Festival in San Francisco, California.

References

External links

2001 births
Living people
21st-century Canadian actresses
21st-century First Nations people
21st-century Canadian women singers
Actresses from British Columbia
Canadian film actresses
First Nations actresses
First Nations musicians
K'omoks
Musicians from British Columbia
Indspire Awards